is an action video game set in feudal Japan and is based upon the Samurai Warriors series by Koei and Omega Force, a spin-off of the Dynasty Warriors series. The game was revealed for the Wii at Nintendo's pre-E3 conference under the name "Sengoku Action".

Gameplay
The game is played with the Wii Remote and Nunchuk attachment, and the action is seen from a first-person viewpoint. In battle, the player character is equipped with one melee weapon (such as a sword or spear) and one ranged weapon (such as a bow and arrow or cannon). The player can freely switch between melee and ranged weapons during combat. Attacks are performed through either pressing the attack button on the Wii Remote to attack single enemies, or motion-based attacks that can damage  groups. The game also includes a competitive multiplayer mode for two players.

Outside of combat, there are running sequences where players must swing their arms with the Wii Remote and Nunchuk in hand to simulate the arms pumping in a running motion. Horseback riding is also included, with the Wii Remote performing the function of the reins while the Nunchuk is used as a whip.

Reception

Samurai Warriors: Katana: was met with very mixed reception upon release; GameRankings gave it a score of 53.15%, while Metacritic gave it 53 out of 100.

The game was given 2.5 stars out of five by GameSpy and was rated 4.5 out of 10 by GameSpot. In the review by GameSpot, Lark Anderson said "If you enjoy waggling your controller around randomly, this is the game for you." IGN gave it a 5.8 out of 10 rating, with the graphics and presentation being the lowest points.

References

External links
Official website of Samurai Warriors: KATANA (Europe)
Sengoku Musou KATANA at Gamecity 

2007 video games
Koei games
Video games about samurai
Samurai Warriors
Video games developed in Japan
Video games set in feudal Japan
Wii-only games
Wii games
Single-player video games